The Plot Against Harry is an American comedy film directed by Michael Roemer. The plot involves Harry Plotnick, a small-time Jewish gangster living in a now largely Hispanic and African American New York neighborhood playing the numbers game after being released from prison.

Background
Filming took place in 1969, and the film played for one week at the Blue Mouse Theatre in Seattle in January 1971, but it was not given a general theatrical release until 1989.

Accolades
It was screened out of competition at the 1990 Cannes Film Festival. It was also nominated for six Film Independent Spirit Awards.

Cast
 Henry Nemo as Max
 Martin Priest as Harry Plotnick
 Ben Lang as Leo
 Maxine Woods as Kay
 Jacques Taylor as Jack
 Jean Leslie as Irene
 Ellen Herbert as Mae
 Sandra Kazan as Margie
 Ronald Coralian as Mel Skolnik
 Max Ulman as Sidney

References

External links

Rotten Tomatoes
Jewish Film Institute

1971 films
1971 comedy films
1970s rediscovered films
American black-and-white films
American comedy films
Rediscovered American films
Films directed by Michael Roemer
1970s English-language films
1970s American films